South Station is a train station in Boston, Massachusetts, United States.

Other stations with the word south in their names include:

Austria

 Graz Hauptbahnhof (Graz Südbahnhof)
 Wien Südbahnhof

Belgium

 Antwerpen-Zuid railway station
 Brussels-South railway station
 Charleroi-South railway station
 Haren-South railway station

China

 Beijing South railway station
 Guangzhou South railway station
 Tianjin South station

Denmark

 Faxe Syd Station, Faxe
 Græsted South railway halt (Græsted Syd)
 Hadsund South Station

France

 Gare de Colmar-Sud, Colmar
 Gare du Sud, Nice

Germany

 Bad Oeynhausen Süd station
 Bad Schönborn Süd station
 Bad St Peter Süd station
 Berlin Messe Süd railway station
 Chemnitz Süd station
 Darmstadt Süd station
 Essen Süd station
 Frankfurt (Main) Süd station
 Greifswald Süd station
 Hilden Süd station
 Kolkwitz Süd station
 Köln Süd station
 Kronberg (Taunus) Süd station
 Lichterfelde Süd station
 Limburg Süd station
 Mainz Römisches Theater station (Mainz Süd)
 Marburg Süd station
 München Süd station
 Recklinghausen Süd station

Hungary

 Budapest Déli station

Italy

 Saronno Sud railway station

Netherlands

 Amsterdam Zuid station
 Arnhem Zuid railway station
 Barneveld Zuid railway station
 Bussum Zuid railway station
 Den Helder Zuid railway station
 Diemen Zuid station
 Dordrecht Zuid railway station
 Emmen Zuid railway station
 Kampen Zuid railway station
 Lelystad Zuid railway station
 Rotterdam Zuid railway station
 Santpoort Zuid railway station
 Soest Zuid railway station

Russia

 Kaliningrad South railway station (Калининград-Южный)

Sweden

 Arlanda South Station (Arlanda södra station)
 Örebro South Station, Örebro
 Stockholm South Station

Switzerland

 Bern Bümpliz Süd railway station
 Bern Weissenbühl railway station 
 Corcelles-Sud railway station
 Grenchen Süd railway station
 Langenthal Süd railway station
 Vaulruz-Sud railway station, Vaulruz
 Vuadens-Sud railway station, Vuadens

Ukraine

 Pivdennyi Vokzal (Kharkiv Metro)

United Kingdom

 Blackpool South railway station, London
 Bromley South railway station, London
 Chessington South railway station, London
 Dorchester South railway station
 Reddish South railway station
 Thorne South railway station

United States

 South Station (subway), a Boston subway station co-located with the train station of the same name

See also

North Station (disambiguation)
East Station (disambiguation)
West station (disambiguation)